Cochylis argentinana is a species of moth of the family Tortricidae. It is found in northern Argentina and Brazil (Paraná, Goiás).

References

Moths described in 1967
Cochylis